Troy Stephen Bell (born 5 September 1973) is an Australian politician representing the South Australian House of Assembly seat of Mount Gambier. Representing the South Australian Division of the Liberal Party of Australia at the 2014 state election, he became an independent in 2017, after being accused of misappropriating more than $2 million of public money.

Early life
Bell held many positions within the Education Sector, particularly in rural areas of South Australia.

Bell began his teaching career at the Port Augusta Secondary School. Bell then decided to move to Mount Gambier where he established the Independent Learning Centre at Mount Gambier in 2007.

Political career 
Bell was elected to the South Australian House of Assembly seat of Mount Gambier at the 2014 state election for a four-year term.

In January 2016 Bell was appointed the Chair of the Liberal Party's Regional Affairs Committee.

Bell quit the Liberal Party and became an independent on 17 August 2017 after being charged the week prior with 20 counts of theft and six counts of dishonestly dealing with documents. Resulting from the Independent Commissioner Against Corruption (ICAC), it is alleged that between 2009 and 2013, Bell dishonestly dealt with more than $2million of public money, and that he used documents known to be false, with the intention of claiming a benefit for himself. He released a statement claiming he is "innocent of these allegations of theft and dishonesty and will defend them in court". He intends to remain in parliament. Ahead of the 2018 election, the Liberals re-opened preselection in his seat and instead endorsed Craig Marsh as the Liberal candidate for Mount Gambier. Bell announced he would re-contest Mount Gambier at the 2018 election as an independent candidate.

The complaint was referred to ICAC following the 2014 election by then Australian Labor Party sub-branch President and Deputy Mayor of the City of Mount Gambier Penny Richardson.

A ReachTEL poll of 655 voters in the electorate was conducted on 13 February 2018, a month before the election, which unexpectedly found Bell who is running as an independent candidate would easily retain his seat after preferences, strongly leading the primary vote on 36 percent. The Liberals were on 28.5 percent (−23.3), Labor was on 13 percent (+2.1), new SA Best was on 11 percent, others were collectively on 6 percent, with the remaining 5 percent undecided. On 17 March 2018 Troy Bell was elected as an independent member for Mount Gambier.

References

External links
Parliamentary Profile

Members of the South Australian House of Assembly
Living people
21st-century Australian politicians
1973 births